Otto Kestola (born 20 May 1936) is a Finnish gymnast. He competed at the 1960 Summer Olympics and the 1964 Summer Olympics.

References

1936 births
Living people
Finnish male artistic gymnasts
Olympic gymnasts of Finland
Gymnasts at the 1960 Summer Olympics
Gymnasts at the 1964 Summer Olympics
Sportspeople from Vyborg
20th-century Finnish people